

This is a list of the National Register of Historic Places listings in Portland, Maine.

This is intended to be a complete list of the properties and districts on the National Register of Historic Places in Portland, Cumberland County, Maine, United States. Latitude and longitude coordinates are provided for many National Register properties and districts; these locations may be seen together in an online map.

There are 243 properties and districts listed on the National Register in Cumberland County, including 11 National Historic Landmarks. 148 of these properties and districts, including 4 National Historic Landmarks, are located outside of Portland, and are listed separately, while the 95 properties and districts in Portland are listed here. Two properties in Portland were once listed but have been removed.

Current listings

|}

Former listings

|}

See also

 List of National Historic Landmarks in Maine
 National Register of Historic Places listings in Maine

References

Portland, Maine
Portland
History of Portland, Maine

NRHP
Portland